Aaron Earl Livingston, also known by his stage name Son Little, is an American rhythm & blues musician from Philadelphia, Pennsylvania, United States.

Livingston is a son of a preacher.

Career
On November 10, 2014, Livingston released his debut EP as Son Little titled Things I Forgot via Anti- Records.

On October 16, 2015, Livingston released his first studio album, Son Little, with Anti- Records.

Son Little has collaborated with The Roots, RJD2, and Mavis Staples, whom he spoke highly of. In an interview with Sound of Boston he named Mavis Staples as one of his favorite singers; "She's one of my favorite people, let alone favorite singer."

On June 6, 2017, he released "Blue Magic (Waikiki)" as the first single off his next studio album, New Magic, which he announced would be released on September 15, 2017, via Anti- Records. On August 1, 2017, he released "Demon To The Dark" as the second single off New Magic.

Influences
In an interview with Sound of Boston, Livingston cited Paul McCartney's Ram, Kendrick Lamar's Good Kid, M.A.A.D City, Grizzly Bear's Shields and Little Dragon's Ritual Union as inspirations for his debut album.

Discography

Studio albums
The Abandoned Lullaby (2011) (with RJD2, as Icebird)
Son Little (2015)
New Magic (2017)
Aloha (2020)
Like Neptune (2022)

EPs
Things I Forgot (2014)

Guest appearances
The Roots – "Guns Are Drawn" from The Tipping Point (2004)
Hezekiah – "Right On" from Hurry Up & Wait (2005)
Hezekiah – "Moments in Sometime" from I Predict a Riot (2007)
Hezekiah – "Here's to the World" from Conscious Porn (2010)
RJD2 – "Crumbs Off the Table" from The Colossus (2010)
The Roots – "Sleep" from Undun (2011)
MHz Legacy – "Tero Smith" from MHz Legacy (2012)
Hot Sugar – "Honeycomb Hideout" from Midi Murder (2013)
RJD2 – "Love and Go" from More Is Than Isn't (2013)
RJD2 – "We Come Alive" from Dame Fortune (2016)
Portugal. The Man – "Number One" from Woodstock (2017)

References

External links
 
 
 

Year of birth missing (living people)
Living people
American rhythm and blues guitarists
American rhythm and blues singers
Musicians from Philadelphia
Record producers from Pennsylvania
Singer-songwriters from Pennsylvania
Anti- (record label) artists